Victorine Nordenswan (1838—1872) was a Finnish painter in the Düsseldorf tradition, specialising in religious themes, and notable as one of the first professional female artists of Finland.

Visual art in the mid-19th century was male-dominated, but Nordenswan was considered to be exceptionally talented, and widely expected to make a significant career as an artist. However, she died of tuberculosis at age 34.

Nordenswan trained at the Royal Swedish Academy of Fine Arts in Stockholm in 1860–1862, and from 1864 onwards in Düsseldorf. Her public debut was in 1861, and she won in the Finnish Art Society's  the second prize in 1865, followed by the first prize in 1867.

Among her best-known works are St. John the Evangelist (1866) and Women Mourning at Christ’s Grave (1868), both today housed at the Finnish National Gallery.

Gallery

References

19th-century women artists
19th-century Finnish painters
Finnish women painters
People from Hämeenlinna
Düsseldorf school of painting
1838 births
1872 deaths